Tønsbergs Blad is a local newspaper published in Tønsberg, Norway. The newspaper was founded by printer Hans Jørgen Magnus Hansen on 3 August 1870, with an initial circulation of 210 copies. By the turn of the century the circulation had grown to 2,600. In 1881 the newspaper was purchased by Tønsbergs Aktietrykkeri, to operate as a conservative publication. In 1986 Orkla Media ASpart of the Orkla Grouptook over ownership. When this company was taken over by the Mecom Group in 2006, it changed name to Edda Media.

Tønsbergs Blad had a circulation of 30,354 copies in 2007. The newspaper employs 98 people full-time, and the editor in chief is Håkon Borud.

References

External links
 Official website

1870 establishments in Norway
Newspapers published in Norway
Norwegian-language newspapers
Publications established in 1870
Mass media in Vestfold
Tønsberg